Ronald L. Thompson (August 19, 1899 – June 19, 1986) was an American politician from Pennsylvania.

Biography
Ronald L. Thompson was born in Shamokin, Pennsylvania on August 19, 1899. He served in the United States Army during World War I and in the United States Army Air Forces during World War II. While living in Mount Lebanon, Pennsylvania, Thompson, a Republican, served in the Pennsylvania House of Representatives from 1941 to 1942 and again from 1949 to 1966.

Personal life
Thompson married Elsie Calvert (April 5, 1899 – March 21, 2013) in 1921, and they remained married until his death 65 years later. Elsie Thompson would later become well known in her own right, as the second-oldest living American for three months in early 2013. He died on June 19, 1986, in Clearwater, Florida, aged 86.

Notes

External links

1899 births
1986 deaths
People from Mt. Lebanon, Pennsylvania
People from Shamokin, Pennsylvania
Republican Party members of the Pennsylvania House of Representatives
20th-century American politicians
United States Army Air Forces soldiers
Military personnel from Pennsylvania